Administrative Decisions (Judicial Review) Act 1977 (Cth) is an Act of the Parliament of Australia, which created the ability to appeal the decision at the Federal Court of Australia for a person or other parties affected by most administrative decisions by an Australian federal department or agency. Review of administrative decisions under the Act is limited to matters of law.

Legacy
In 1989, the then president of the New South Wales Court of Appeal Michael Kirby wrote that the Administrative Decisions (Judicial Review) Act and the Administrative Appeals Tribunal Act 1975 were "probably the most adventurous and far-reaching legal reforms" to have taken place in Australia. In a 2011 seminar, the then President of the Administrative Appeals Tribunal Garry Downes wrote that, of the reforms of administrative law in the 1970s and 1980s, (including the establishment of the Federal Court, the Commonwealth Ombudsman, and the Administrative Appeals Tribunal) the Administrative Decisions (Judicial Review) Act was the most significant legislative work of the reform.

References

Bibliography 
 
Acts of the Parliament of Australia
Australian administrative law
1977 in Australian law